Science Fiction: The 100 Best Novels, An English-Language Selection, 1949–1984 is a nonfiction book by David Pringle, published by Xanadu in 1985 with a foreword by Michael Moorcock.  Primarily, the book comprises 100 short essays on the selected works, covered in order of publication, without any ranking. It is considered an important critical summary of the science fiction field.

Pringle followed Science Fiction with Modern Fantasy: The 100 Best Novels (1988). Xanadu followed Science Fiction with at least three more "100 Best" books (below).

Scope

In the introduction Pringle offers the working definition, "Science fiction is a form of fantastic fiction which exploits the imaginative perspectives of modern science." In turn, modern science is the "scientific world-view ... as it has come to be accepted by the intelligent layperson", which arguably "first became common property in the mid to late 19th century."

Within fiction he distinguishes science fiction from "Supernatural Horror" and "Heroic Fantasy". They may be represented by Dracula and The Lord of the Rings, featuring "the irruption of some supernatural force into the everyday world" and "set in completely imaginary worlds" respectively. He also names the subclass "Fabulations", which do not belong in this book "unless they have a significant scientific or technological content".

In contrast, science fiction has a real-world setting and "fantastic developments which are explicable in terms of the scientific world-view." World-view does not mean accepted theory or fact: "many sf writers cheat: they use sleight-of-hand rather than genuine scientific knowledge." "The skilful use of pseudo-science and gobbledygook" may be good enough to exploit the world-view.

The time period covered is approximately that for science fiction as a category of book publication, although the selected books were not all published in that category.

Pringle admits that fewer than thirty selections may generously be called even "masterpieces of their sort". On the whole,Some of them are old favourites of my own ... Some are other people's favourites, novels which have been outstandingly popular or influential, or which seem to be especially good representatives of their type. A small minority, perhaps as many as ten, are books for which I have little or no personal enthusiasm: they have been included for the sake of balance and variety.

The List

100 Best series

Xanadu Publications of London published at least four "100 Best" books. Transatlantic editions or simply jacket and cover designs may variably use "the" and "hundred" in the subtitles. Carroll & Graf published the books in the U.S.

 Science Fiction: The 100 Best Novels, by David Pringle (1985), foreword by Michael Moorcock
 Crime and Mystery: The 100 Best Books, by H.R.F. Keating (1987), foreword by Patricia Highsmith
 Horror: The 100 Best Books, edited by Stephen Jones and Kim Newman (November 1988)
 Fantasy: The 100 Best Books, by James Cawthorn and Michael Moorcock (November 1988)

Xanadu commissioned Moorcock to write Fantasy. When it became "clear that I would not be able to deliver it for a long time, the publishers and I agreed that James Cawthorn was the person to take it over." Cawthorn was the primary author of the selections "mainly", according to Cawthorn, and of the text "by far", according to Moorcock. (Fantasy, "Introduction", p. 9. The introduction, pp. 8–10, comprises a long section signed by Cawthorn, a short one signed by Moorcock, and joint unsigned "Notes and Acknowledgments".)

Science Fiction is a collection of 100 reviews, nearly uniform in length (all one to two pages), with a moderately long introduction by the author.

Horror comprises essays on 100 different books by 100(?) horror writers, apparently more-than-one- to less-than-six pages in length.

Fantasy is a collection of 100 reviews, nearly uniform in length (little short of two pages), with a short introduction by the authors separately and jointly.

Reception
Dave Langford reviewed Science Fiction: The 100 Best Novels for White Dwarf #73, and stated that "Most of my favourites are there, and only a scattering of dodgy selections - like Mack Reynolds, an 'ideas and concepts' man whose writing makes my teeth hurt."

Reviews
Review by L. J. Hurst (1985) in Paperback Inferno, #57
Review by Dan Chow (1986) in Locus, #300 January 1986
Review by Brian Stableford (1986) in Fantasy Review, February 1986
Review by Edward James (1986) in Vector 130
Review by Andy Watson (1986) in PKDS Newsletter, #11
Review by Fernando Quadros Gouvea (1986) in Science Fiction Review, Winter 1986
Review by Gregory Feeley (1986) in Foundation, #36 Summer 1986
Review by Doug Fratz (1986) in Thrust, #24, Summer 1986
Review by Baird Searles (1987) in Isaac Asimov's Science Fiction Magazine, June 1987
Review by Don D'Ammassa (1988) in Science Fiction Chronicle, #100 January 1988
Review by Tom Easton (1988) in Analog Science Fiction/Science Fact, August 1988
Review by Darrell Schweitzer (1989) in Aboriginal Science Fiction, July-August 1989
Review by Matthew Appleton (1999) in The New York Review of Science Fiction, July 1999

Notes

References

External links
 at WorldsWithoutEnd.com —linked contents with front cover images 
 —with review history

 
Science fiction studies
Lists of novels
1985 non-fiction books
Books about books
Top book lists